Tilva Njagra (Serbian Cyrillic: Тилва Њагра) is a mountain in eastern Serbia, near the town of Zlot. Its highest peak has an elevation of 770 meters above sea level.

References

Mountains of Serbia